The Perishable Empire or The Perishable Empire: Essays on Indian Writing in English is an English-language collection of essays written by Meenakshi Mukherjee . The book was first published in 2001 by  Oxford University Press and was awarded Sahitya Akademi Award in 2003.

References

External links 

2001 books
Sahitya Akademi Award-winning works